The 2010 AFC Cup group stage matches took place between 23 February and 28 April 2010. The draw for the group stage was held on 7 December 2009 in Kuala Lumpur, Malaysia.

Groups

Group A

Group B

Group C

Group D

Group E

Group F

Group G

Group H

References

Group Stage